Sankata Temple, is one of the temples located at Te Bahal, Kathmandu, Nepal. Sankata is a popular divinity who is worshipped, especially on Saturdays, to ward off bad luck and sickness. Sankata is worshiped by Buddhist as well who accredit the shrine to Chanda Mahoroshan. One of the curious things about the deity is that for Hindus, Sankata is a goddess while Buddhist take the deity as God Bhairav.

This shrine along with Mahankal Than and Lumadi than are worshiped together on a single day.

History/Legend
Legend has it that during the rule of the Malla King Narendra Dev, a Gubhajyu, a Buddhist sorcerer skilled in Tantrik practices, called Bandhu Ratna Bajracharya, with the permission from the king, used his Tantrik powers and brought Sankata and Yogini into two different holy pitchers and worshipped them. Later, a temple for the goddess was established during the reign of King Gunakama Dev.
Even today, every 12 years, the priest of the temple, a Buddhist Gubhajyu of the Newar Bajracharya clan, worships the goddess in a holy pitcher along with another pitcher for Yogini at the Katuwal Daha at Chobhar and then the goddesses are enshrined in the temple.

According to cultural expert Indra Mali, who grew up in Te Bahal, Sankata is not originally from Kathmandu. There's another legend that states Palah: Dya, as Buddhists call the deity, was brought from Kamaru Kamachya (the present Kamakhya) in Assam. Palah: Dya later became widely known as Sankata.

Rituals & Festivals
The deity is worshiped by following secret Tantrik rituals. The priest must not be touched at the temple, nor must the statue of the goddess. The statue of the goddess is draped in cloth covering her body except for her head. 
Devotion to Sankata is commonly believed to ward off troubles and bad omens from one's life. Although religious rites are carried out every day, the temple is frequented mostly on Saturdays, or on one's birthday. Everything required for worship is available right outside the temple. One can also ask the priests to do some puja for placating one's unfavorable planets and stars. For that, one will have to have oil, iron, black cloth and black lentils.
Every 12 years, the priest of the temple, a Buddhist Gubhaju of the Newar Bajracharya clan, worships the goddess in a holy pitcher along with another pitcher for Yogini at the Katuwal Daha at Chobhar and then the goddesses are enshrined in the temple. The route of the 12 years jatra is kept secret.

References 

Hindu temples in Kathmandu District